Antônio de Castro Mayer (20 June 1904 – 25 April 1991) was a Brazilian prelate of the Roman Catholic Church. A Traditionalist Catholic and ally of Archbishop Marcel Lefebvre, he was Bishop of Campos from 1949 until his resignation in 1981.

He is often described as incurring the automatic canonical penalty of excommunication for participating in the 1988 illicit consecration of four bishops of the Society of St. Pius X (SSPX), as did Lefebvre and the four bishops then ordained. He was mentioned in the letter from Cardinal Gantin on July 1  but not in the letter from Pope John Paul II on July 2.

Early life

Antônio de Castro Mayer was born in Campinas, São Paulo, to João Mayer, a Bavarian stonemason, and his wife, Francisca de Castro, a Brazilian peasant. One of twelve children, Antônio helped his mother support their family after João died in 1910. At age 12, he entered São Paulo's minor seminary, then run by the Premonstratensian Fathers. He entered the major seminary in 1922 and then studied at the Pontifical Gregorian University in Rome, obtaining his doctorate in theology in 1928. He was ordained to the priesthood by Cardinal Basilio Pompili on 30 October 1927. He taught philosophy, history of philosophy, and dogmatic theology at the seminary in São Paulo for the next 13 years.

He became Assistant General of the São Paulo's Catholic Action in 1940 and a canon of the cathedral chapter with the title of First Treasurer in 1941. He became vicar general of the archdiocese in 1942. He was made a parish priest and the prefect of studies at the Pontifical Catholic University of São Paulo in 1945, while retaining the chairs of Religion and Catholic Social Doctrine at the Pontifical Catholic University of São Paulo.

Bishop
On 6 March 1948, de Castro was appointed Coadjutor Bishop of Campos and titular bishop of Priene by Pope Pius XII. He received his episcopal consecration on 23 May from Archbishop Carlo Chiarlo, Apostolic Nuncio to Brazil, with Bishop Ernesto de Paula and Archbishop Geraldo de Proença Sigaud, S.V.D., as co-consecrators. He became bishop of Campos upon the death of Bishop Octaviano de Albuquerque on 3 January 1949. He was very active in opposing liberation theology and communist infiltration of the Church and of his diocese.

In 1968, the Catholic conservative group Tradition, Family and Property organized a campaign to collect signatures denouncing what were perceived as leftists in the Church. De Castro Mayer lent encouragement to the campaign. The National Conference of Bishops of Brazil later declared that TFP was neither recognized by the hierarchy nor considered an official Catholic organization.

De Castro Mayer, a staunch traditionalist, refused to implement the liturgical reforms of the Second Vatican Council in his diocese. Until his resignation on 29 August 1981, the Tridentine Mass continued to be celebrated throughout the Campos diocese, along with all the other traditional Catholic practices and devotions in Latin.

He continued his campaign against the Council's liturgical reforms in retirement and maintained a traditionalist "diocese" within the Campos diocese, with around 40,000 faithful, which he organized in parallel chapels. The total Catholic population of the diocese was 890,000.

On 30 June 1988, he attended the ceremony at which Archbishop Lefebvre consecrated four bishops without papal authorization despite warnings that these consecrations would result in the automatic excommunication of Lefebvre and the four. Communications from Pope John Paul II and curial officials, both before and after the ceremony, did not mention de Castro or note his role. Though often described as a "co-consecrator" of these bishops, the SSPX says he was "found at Archbishop Lefebvre's side" and refers to his "crucial presence", but does not describe him participating in the ceremony of consecration. One Vatican statement described him as a co-consecrator and excommunicated, but others, including Pope John Paul's letter on the consecrations omitted his name.

He died of respiratory failure in Campos on 25 April 1991.

Notes

References 

1904 births
1991 deaths
20th-century Roman Catholic bishops in Brazil
Brazilian people of German descent
Brazilian traditionalist Catholics
Coetus Internationalis Patrum
Deaths from respiratory failure
Écône consecrations
Participants in the Second Vatican Council
People from Campinas
Personal Apostolic Administration of Saint John Mary Vianney
Pontifical Gregorian University alumni
Traditionalist Catholic bishops
Brazilian anti-communists
Roman Catholic bishops of Campos